The following highways are numbered 8. For roads numbered A8, see list of A8 roads. For roads numbered N8, see list of N8 roads.

Route 8, or Highway 8, may refer to:

International
 Asian Highway 8
 European route E08 
 European route E008

Argentina
 National Route 8
  Buenos Aires Provincial Route 8

Australia

New South Wales 
 A8 (Sydney) (New South Wales)
 Westconnex M8 (New South Wales)

Northern Territory 
 Ross Highway (Northern Territory)

Queensland 
 Maroochydore Road (Queensland)

Tasmania 
 East Tamar Highway (Tasmania)

South Australia and Victoria

South Australia 
Dukes Highway
Western Highway (Victoria)(SA/VIC)

Victoria 
  Western Freeway (Victoria)
  Western Highway (Victoria)
  Ballarat Road, Melbourne

Austria
 Innkreis Autobahn

Bulgaria
 I-8 road (Bulgaria)

Burma
National Highway 8 (Burma)

Cambodia 
 National Highway 8 (Cambodia)

Canada
 Alberta Highway 8
 British Columbia Highway 8
Manitoba Highway 8
 New Brunswick Route 8
 Northwest Territories Highway 8 (Dempster Highway)
 Nova Scotia Trunk 8
 Ontario Highway 8
Prince Edward Island Route 8
 Quebec Route 8 (former)
 Saskatchewan Highway 8
Yukon Highway 8

Czech Republic
 D8 Motorway
 R8 Expressway (Czech: Prosecká radiála)
 I/8 Highway (Czech: Silnice I/8)

Djibouti
  RN-8 (Djibouti)

Eswatini
MR8 road

Greece
 Greek National Road 8

Hong Kong
 Route 8 (Hong Kong)

Hungary
 M8 expressway (Hungary)
 Main road 8 (Hungary)

India
  National Highway 8 (India)
 State Highway 8 (Kerala)

Iraq
Highway 8 (Iraq)

Ireland
 M8 motorway (Republic of Ireland)
 N8 road (Ireland)

Italy
 Autostrada A8
 RA 8

Japan
 Japan National Route 8

Malaysia
 Gua Musang Highway

Mexico
Mexican Federal Highway 8

Montenegro
M-8 highway (Montenegro)

New Zealand
 New Zealand State Highway 8
 New Zealand State Highway 8A
 New Zealand State Highway 8B

Paraguay
 National Route 8

Philippines
 N8 highway (Philippines)

Poland 
  Motorway A8
  Expressway S8
  National road 8

Russia
 M8 highway (Russia)

Taiwan 
  National Freeway 8
  Provincial Highway 8

United Kingdom
 M8 motorway (Great Britain)
 A8 road (Great Britain)
 A8(M) motorway (Great Britain) (former)
 A8 road (Northern Ireland)
 A8(M) motorway (Northern Ireland)

United States
 Interstate 8
 Interstate 8 Business
 U.S. Route 8
 New England Interstate Route 8 (former)
 Alabama State Route 8
 Alaska Route 8
 Arkansas Highway 8
 California State Route 8 (former)
 Colorado State Highway 8
 Connecticut Route 8
 Delaware Route 8
 Florida State Road 8
 Florida State Road 8A
 Georgia State Route 8
 Idaho State Highway 8
 Illinois Route 8
 Indiana State Road 8
 Iowa Highway 8
 K-8 (Kansas highway)
 Kentucky Route 8
 Louisiana Highway 8
 Louisiana State Route 8 (former)
 Maine State Route 8
 Maryland Route 8
 Massachusetts Route 8
 Massachusetts Route 8A
 M-8 (Michigan highway)
 Mississippi Highway 8
 Missouri Route 8
 Missouri Route 8 (1922) (former)
 Nebraska Highway 8
 Nevada State Route 8 (former)
 Nevada State Route 8A (former)
 Nevada State Route 8B (former)
 New Jersey Route 8 (former)
 New Jersey Route 8N (former)
 County Route 8 (Monmouth County, New Jersey)
 County Route 8A (Monmouth County, New Jersey)
 County Route 8B (Monmouth County, New Jersey)
 New Mexico State Road 8
 New York State Route 8
 County Route 8 (Allegany County, New York)
 County Route 8 (Broome County, New York)
 County Route 8 (Cattaraugus County, New York)
 County Route 8 (Chemung County, New York)
 County Route 8 (Clinton County, New York)
 County Route 8 (Columbia County, New York)
 County Route 8A (Columbia County, New York)
 County Route 8 (Dutchess County, New York)
 County Route 8 (Genesee County, New York)
 County Route 8 (Jefferson County, New York)
 County Route 8 (Lewis County, New York)
 County Route 8 (Nassau County, New York)
 County Route 8 (Ontario County, New York)
 County Route 8 (Oswego County, New York)
 County Route 8 (Otsego County, New York)
 County Route 8 (Rensselaer County, New York)
 County Route 8 (Rockland County, New York)
 County Route 8 (Schuyler County, New York)
 County Route 8 (St. Lawrence County, New York)
 County Route 8 (Suffolk County, New York)
 County Route 8 (Ulster County, New York)
 North Carolina Highway 8
 North Dakota Highway 8
 Ohio State Route 8
 Oklahoma State Highway 8
 Oklahoma State Highway 8A
 Oklahoma State Highway 8B
 Oregon Route 8
 Pennsylvania Route 8
 South Carolina Highway 8
 South Dakota Highway 8 (former)
 Tennessee State Route 8
 Texas State Highway 8
  Texas State Highway Beltway 8
 Texas State Highway Loop 8
 Texas Farm to Market Road 8
 Texas Park Road 8
 Texas Recreational Road 8
 Utah State Route 8
 Utah State Route 8 (1910-1977) (former)
 Vermont Route 8
 Vermont Route 8A
 Virginia State Route 8
 Washington State Route 8
 Primary State Highway 8 (Washington) (former)
 West Virginia Route 8
Territories
 Guam Highway 8
 Puerto Rico Highway 8

Uruguay 
  Route 8 Brigadier Gral. Juan Antonio Lavalleja

Vietnam 
 Vietnam National Route 8

See also